Adeoye "Oye" Owolewa (born 1989) is a Nigerian American politician, pharmacist, and a member of the Democratic Party. In November 2020, he was elected as the shadow representative of the United States House of Representatives from the District of Columbia. As a shadow congressperson, Owolewa is tasked with lobbying for D.C. statehood; the unpaid position is authorized by D.C. voters in 1982, but never approved by Congress. Although mistakenly described in Nigerian media as the first Nigerian American to be elected to the U.S. Congress, Owolewa is not a member of Congress.

Early life and education 

Owolewa was born in Nigeria, to a father from Omu Aran in Kwara State and a mother from Ilesa in Osun State. He is the grandson of Phoebe C. Ajayi-Obe, a senior advocate of Nigeria. Oye was raised in Newton, Massachusetts and nearby Boston, where he attended Boston Latin School and graduated in 2008. In 2014, he earned a doctorate in pharmacy from Northeastern University and moved to Washington to practice pharmacy.

Career
In 2014, he started work as a pharmacist.

Oye is a Cardinal GenerationRx Champions Award winner.

Politics 
In 2018, Oye was elected a D.C. Advisory Neighborhood Commission for Ward 8, District 8E.

In May 2018, the Capital Stonewall Democrats endorsed Oye Owolewa as the District's shadow U.S. representative with 66.1% of the vote on the first ballot.

In 2020, a special thanksgiving prayer was held on Sunday in honor of Owolewa after being elected as the U.S. Shadow Member for Columbia District by members of his family in Omu-Aran, Kwara State, Nigeria.
The prayer, which was led by the Chief Imam of Omu Aran, took place at the Owolewa family compound, in Igangu, Omu Aran, headquarters of Irepodun local government area of Kwara State.

In August 2021, Oye called out Sen. Joe Manchin for his lack of supporting DC statehood legislatively.

In May 2022, in a straw poll conducted as opposed to endorsements, Oye was able to ganner 35.8% of the vote.
In November 2020, Oye Owolewa was elected as a U.S. Shadow Representative
for District of Columbia.

Case for D.C. statehood 
In an article titled "The Time Is Now For D C Statehood" in the Washington Socialist publication, Oye states that Without statehood, District of Columbia is limited in its ability to raise revenue, since all of its laws are subject to Congressional approval and much of its land is federally-owned and therefore untaxed. Despite having state-like duties, from education to road maintenance, the District is explicitly barred from taxing the wages earned by non-residents who work within its borders, unlike any other state. The prohibition on such state revenue collection practices makes it hard for the District to respond to crises such as the pandemic.

He said, "D.C. residents are forced into second-class citizenship in the richest nation in history. Recent events and legislation have highlighted the disparity between how Washingtonians are treated compared to everyone else. While D C residents pay the highest amount of federal income taxes per capita, we receive less than equal share from the government. For example, compared to our neighbors in all other states, DC received 60% less emergency aid resources from the CARES act to combat COVID-19 and support our financial, health care, and infrastructural well-being. By denying D C statehood, Congress is suppressing our voting representation and say in national policy. Our lack of statehood also prohibits our right to self-govern. Once D.C. statehood is achieved, local leaders can pass legislation and set a budget without the threat of federal interference. D C statehood will also allow us to control our criminal justice system so we can escape a punitive structure of mass incarceration and transition to a progressive system favoring diversion programs. Last but not least, once D C becomes the 51st state, we will control our own resources, and President Trump would no longer be able to deploy our national guard against us when we march peacefully. The fight for D C statehood not only ends our nation's longest case of voter suppression but also gives residents of the nation's capital the right to live free of government control."

On January 17, 2022, Oye participated in the 16th annual Peace Walk in Ward 8. The focus of the Peace Walk was to urge the U.S. Senate to consider the Freedom to Vote Act of 2021 and the John Lewis Voting Rights Advancement Act of 2021. "Members of the [Martin Luther] King family support statehood, and I have seen them wear T-shirts indicating that," Oye said.

On March 11, 2022, at the State Capitol Building in Charleston, WV, DC Representative Oye Owolewa led an opportunity to introduce a DC Statehood Resolution (HCR 86) with Minority Leader Doug Skaff Jr. and State Representative Sean Hornbuckle.

LGBTQ rights
In an article titled "Anti-trans legislation has ripple effect in D.C.", Oye states that many of these bills target transgender and non-binary youth by making it illegal to access or provide gender-affirming medical care and denying the best-equipped healthcare providers the ability to provide appropriate care for the trans community. This results in wasteful spending, increased healthcare costs, and worse outcomes.

He explained that gender-affirming care is essential to inclusive, comprehensive transgender health care. According to the Trevor Project's 2020 National Survey on LGBTQ, Youth Mental Health, more than half of transgender and nonbinary youth have seriously considered suicide. Conversely, affirming gender identity among transgender and nonbinary youth is consistently associated with lower rates of suicide attempts.

He said, "We believe that all people deserve high-quality health care and compassionate, nonjudgmental health information, no matter what. Following the International Day Against Homophobia, Transphobia, and Biphobia (May 17), we ask that you reach out to loved ones across the country and have a conversation to help move the issue out of a political debate and into a conversation about the lives of real people. Just one conversation can make a huge impact."

Advocacy
Oye worked to bring resources to the underserved by advising D.C. lawmakers based on continued community feedback. He has served as a commissioner since 2018, his first elected office. As commissioner, Oye learned the value of being an advocate and community resource. Some of Oye's most notable achievements were increasing science enrichment programs in Southeast elementary schools, adding traffic safety measures, and helping to bring a Senior Day Center to the neighborhood.

Climate change 
In July 2022, Owolewa joined a campaign to protest the Supreme Court's to limit the Environmental Protection Agency's ability to regulate greenhouse gases and to call for more action on climate change.

Personal life

Vegan lifestyle 
In May 2022, Owolewa, alongside Chef Spike Mendelsohn, co-chaired
D.C's first-ever Veg Restaurant Week
.

Mentorship 

Since moving to DC, Dr. Oye spent his non-working time exposing DC elementary students to science through hands-on learning and advocated for strategies to reduce prescription drug abuse. His work led him to earn the Cardinal Health Generation Rx Champions Award by the Washington DC Pharmacy Association.

Dr. Oye notably increased science enrichment in Southeast DC, improved traffic safety infrastructure, and formed a collaboration with Howard students participating in Councilman Trayon White's health fairs.

Electoral history

References 

1989 births
21st-century American politicians
American pharmacists
American people of Nigerian descent
American politicians of Nigerian descent
American people of Yoruba descent
Living people
United States shadow representatives from the District of Columbia
Washington, D.C., Democrats
Yoruba politicians